NCAA Division III (D-III) is a division of the National Collegiate Athletic Association (NCAA) in the United States. D-III consists of athletic programs at colleges and universities that choose not to offer athletic scholarships to their student-athletes.

The NCAA's first split was into two divisions, the University and College Divisions, in 1956, the College Division was formed for smaller schools that did not have the resources of the major athletic programs across the country. The College Division split again in 1973 when the NCAA went to its current naming convention: Division I, Division II, and Division III. Division III schools are not allowed to offer athletic scholarships, while D-II schools can.

Division III is the NCAA's largest division with around 450 member institutions, which are 80% private and 20% public. The median undergraduate enrollment of D-III  schools is about 2,750, although the range is from 418 to over 38,000. Approximately 40% of all NCAA student-athletes compete in D-III.

Requirements
Division III institutions must sponsor at least three team sports for each sex/gender, with each playing season represented by each gender. Teams in which men and women compete together are counted as men's teams for sports sponsorship purposes. In a feature unique to D-III, the total number of required sports varies with each school's full-time undergraduate enrollment. Schools with an enrollment of 1,000 or less must sponsor five men's and five women's sports; those with larger enrollments must sponsor six for each sex/gender. Institutions that sponsor athletic programs for only one sex/gender (single-sex schools, plus a few historically all-female schools that are now coeducational) need only meet the sponsorship requirements for that sex. There are minimum contest rules and participant minimums for each sport.

Division III athletic programs are non-revenue-generating, extracurricular programs that are staffed and funded like any other university department. They feature student-athletes who receive no financial aid related to their athletic ability. Student-athletes cannot redshirt as freshmen, and schools may not use endowments or funds whose primary purpose is to benefit athletic programs.

Division III schools "shall not award financial aid to any student on the basis of athletics leadership, ability, participation or performance". Financial aid given to athletes must be awarded under the same procedures as for the general student body, and the proportion of total financial aid given to athletes "shall be closely equivalent to the percentage of student-athletes within the student body".  The ban on scholarships is strictly enforced. As an example of how seriously the NCAA takes this rule, in 2005 MacMurray College became only the fifth school slapped with a "death penalty" after its men's tennis program gave grants to foreign-born players. The two service academies that are D-III members, Merchant Marine and Coast Guard, do not violate the athletic scholarship ban because all students, whether or not they are varsity athletes, receive the same treatment, a full scholarship.

Another aspect that distinguishes Division III from the other NCAA divisions is that D-III institutions are specifically banned from using the National Letter of Intent, or any other pre-enrollment form that is not executed by other prospective students at the school. The NCAA provides for one exception—a standard, nonbinding celebratory signing form that may be signed by the student upon his or her acceptance of enrollment. However, this form cannot be signed at the campus of that college, and staff members of that college cannot be present at the signing.

Conferences

All-sports conferences
An "all-sports conference" is defined here as one that sponsors both men's and women's basketball. While the NCAA has a much more detailed definition of the term, every NCAA conference (regardless of division) that sponsors basketball meets the organization's requirements for "all-sports" status.

 Allegheny Mountain Collegiate Conference
 American Rivers Conference
 American Southwest Conference
 Atlantic East Conference
 Centennial Conference
 City University of New York Athletic Conference
 Coast to Coast Athletic Conference
 College Conference of Illinois and Wisconsin
 Collegiate Conference of the South
 Colonial States Athletic Conference
 Commonwealth Coast Conference
 Empire 8 Conference
 Great Northeast Athletic Conference
 Heartland Collegiate Athletic Conference
 Landmark Conference
 Liberty League
 Little East Conference
 Massachusetts State Collegiate Athletic Conference
 Michigan Intercollegiate Athletic Association
 Middle Atlantic Conferences
 Midwest Conference
 Minnesota Intercollegiate Athletic Conference
 New England Collegiate Conference
 New England Small College Athletic Conference
 New England Women's and Men's Athletic Conference
 New Jersey Athletic Conference
 North Atlantic Conference
 North Coast Athletic Conference
 Northern Athletics Collegiate Conference
 Northwest Conference
 Ohio Athletic Conference
 Old Dominion Athletic Conference
 Presidents' Athletic Conference
 Skyline Conference
 Southern Athletic Association
 Southern California Intercollegiate Athletic Conference
 Southern Collegiate Athletic Conference
 St. Louis Intercollegiate Athletic Conference
 State University of New York Athletic Conference
 United East Conference
 University Athletic Association
 Upper Midwest Athletic Conference
 USA South Athletic Conference
 Wisconsin Intercollegiate Athletic Conference

Notes

Single-sport conferences
Football
 Eastern Collegiate Football Conference

Ice hockey
 New England Hockey Conference (men and women)
 Northern Collegiate Hockey Association (men and women)
 United Collegiate Hockey Conference (men and women)

Lacrosse
 Midwest Lacrosse Conference (men only)
 Midwest Women's Lacrosse Conference (women only)
 Ohio River Lacrosse Conference (men and women)

Men's volleyball
 Continental Volleyball Conference
 Midwest Collegiate Volleyball League
 United Volleyball Conference

Independents
 Division III independent schools

Division III schools with Division I programs
Ten D-III schools currently field Division I programs in one or two sports, one maximum for each gender. These schools are allowed to offer athletic scholarships only for their Division I men's and women's sports.

Five of them are schools that traditionally competed at the highest level of a particular men's sport prior to the institution of the three division classifications in 1973, a decade before the NCAA governed women's sports. These five colleges (plus three others that later chose to return their Division I programs to Division III) were granted a waiver (a.k.a. a grandfather clause) in 1983 to continue offering scholarships, a waiver that was reaffirmed in 2004. Presumably due to Title IX considerations, grandfathered schools are also allowed to field one women's sport in Division I, and all five schools choose to do so.

 Clarkson University (men's and women's ice hockey)
 Colorado College (men's ice hockey and women's soccer)
 Johns Hopkins University (men's and women's lacrosse)
 Rensselaer Polytechnic Institute (men's and women's ice hockey)
 St. Lawrence University (men's and women's ice hockey)

Three formerly grandfathered schools moved completely to Division III. The State University of New York at Oneonta, which had been grandfathered in men's soccer, moved totally to Division III in 2006. Rutgers University–Newark, which had been grandfathered in men's volleyball, did the same in 2014. Hartwick College, which had been grandfathered in men's soccer and women's water polo, moved its men's soccer program to Division III in 2018 and dropped women's water polo entirely.

The other five schools chose to field Division I programs in one sport for men and/or one sport for women after the original grandfather clause went into effect, so they were not grandfathered and thus were not allowed to offer athletic scholarships. Academic-based and need-based financial aid was still available, as is the case for all of Division III.

 Franklin and Marshall College (men's wrestling)
 Hobart College (men's lacrosse)
 Massachusetts Institute of Technology (women's rowing) 
 Rochester Institute of Technology (men's and women's ice hockey)
 Union College (men's and women's ice hockey)

In addition, Lawrence University was formerly a non-grandfathered program in fencing, but the NCAA no longer conducts a separate Division I fencing championship. Lawrence continues to field a fencing team, but that team is now considered Division III (see below).

In August 2011, the NCAA decided to no longer allow individual programs to move to another division as a general policy. One exception was made in 2012, when RIT successfully argued for a one-time opportunity for colleges with a D-I men's team to add a women's team.

Since no more colleges would be allowed to move individual sports to Division I, the five non-scholarship programs (led by RIT and Union) petitioned to be allowed to offer scholarships in the interests of competitive equity. Division III membership voted in January 2022 to extend the grandfather clause to allow all ten colleges to offer athletic scholarships, effective immediately.

Football and basketball may not be Division I programs at Division III institutions, because their revenue-enhancing potential would give them an unfair advantage over other Division III schools. In 1992, several Division I schools playing Division III football were forced to bring their football programs into Division I, following the passage of the "Dayton Rule" (named after the University of Dayton, whose success in D-III football was seen as threatening the "ethos" of Division III sports). This led directly to the creation of the Pioneer Football League, a non-scholarship football-only Division I FCS conference.

Division III schools playing in non-divisional sports

In addition to the D-III schools with teams that play as Division I members, many other D-III schools have teams that compete alongside D-I and D-II members in sports that the NCAA does not split into divisions. Teams in these sports are not counted as playing in a different division from the rest of the athletic program. D-III members cannot award scholarships in these sports.

Reforms
In 2003, concerned about the disparity of some D-III athletic programs and the focus on national championships, the Division III Presidents' Council, led by Middlebury College President John McCardell, proposed ending the athletic scholarship exemptions for D-I programs, eliminating redshirting, and limiting the length of the traditional and non-traditional seasons. At the January 2004 NCAA convention, an amendment allowed the exemption for grandfathered D-I athletic scholarships to remain in place, but the rest of the reforms passed.

See also
 List of NCAA Division III institutions

References

External links